21 Lyncis is a single star in the northern constellation of Lynx. It is visible to the naked eye as a faint, white-hued star with an apparent visual magnitude of 4.61. The star is located at a distance of about 274 light years away from the Sun, based on parallax. It is moving further away from the Earth with a heliocentric radial velocity of around +27 km/s.

This object is an ordinary A-type main-sequence star with a stellar classification of A0.5Vs, where the 's' suffix indicates "sharp" lines in the spectrum, usually due to slow rotation. It is about 272 million years old with a projected rotational velocity of 18 km/s. The star has 2.22 times the mass of the Sun and is radiating 102 times the luminosity of the Sun from its photosphere at an effective temperature of 9,692 K.

References 

A-type main-sequence stars
Lynx (constellation)
Durchmusterung objects
Lyncis, 21
058142
036145
2818